Tulipa uniflora is a flowering plant species belonging to the genus Tulipa, within the family Liliaceae.

It was first described by Carl Linnaeus in 1770.

Description 
Tulipa uniflora is a perennial plant growing from a bulb. The bulbs are brown and range from 1 - 2cm in diameter. Leaves of this species are narrow, green and linear. Each bulb can sprout a single small flower. Petals are yellow, however the outer side of the petals have a purple tint. The style of each flower is less than 1mm long. Flowers sit on the top of glabrous stems, which range from 10 - 20cm tall.

Distribution 
Tulipa uniflora is native in the following locations: Siberia, Mongolia, Xinjiang, Inner Mongolia and Kazakhstan.

Habitat 
It can be found growing on rocky slopes and mountain sides at altitudes up to 2400 m.

References 

uniflora
Flora of Mongolia